MHL may refer to:
Marshall Islands, ISO, IOC and FIFA country code
Marshall station (Texas), US, Amtrak code 
Mennonite Historical Library, at Goshen College in Indiana, US
Mobile High-Definition Link, for connecting portable devices to displays

Ice hockey leagues 
Maritime Junior Hockey League, in Canada
Minor Hockey League or Molodezhnaya Khokkeinaya Liga, Russia
Manitoba Hockey League, Canada

Field hockey leagues 
Malaysia Hockey League

Other uses 

 Manual handling of loads